Chen Pei-jer (born 1955) is a Taiwanese hepatologist and an academician of Academia Sinica.


Early life and education 
Chen Pei-jer was raised by his grandparents in Shalu, Taichung, while his parents worked in northern Taiwan. He and his three siblings had a strict routine, awakening at 6:00 am daily to exercise and do chores alongside their grandfather, followed by Chinese calligraphy practice. Chen earned a medical degree from National Taiwan University in 1981, and he completed a doctorate at University of Pennsylvania Medical School in 1987.

Career 
Upon completing his doctorate, Chen returned to National Taiwan University as a postdoctoral researcher, later joining the faculty in 1987. He was elected a member of Academia Sinica in 2006, and into The World Academy of Sciences in 2011.

Chen specializes in hepatitis research. He helped treat patients during the 2003 SARS outbreak, and was invited to a SARS-related seminar hosted by the World Health Organization, but did not attend because he was unable to isolate sufficiently after treating SARS patients, per the regulations in force for that meeting. Chen was invited to the 2009 World Health Assembly as part of the Chinese Taipei delegation. During the COVID-19 pandemic in Taiwan, Chen served on the vaccine review committee until late May 2021. Upon announcing his resignation from the body in June, Chen stated that the committee would struggle to remain neutral when reviewing Taiwanese-made vaccines.

References

1955 births
Living people
National Taiwan University alumni
Taiwanese hepatologists
Academic staff of the National Taiwan University
Members of Academia Sinica
University of Pennsylvania alumni
COVID-19 pandemic in Taiwan
20th-century Taiwanese physicians
Scientists from Taichung
Taiwanese expatriates in the United States